Disasuridia is a genus of moths in the subfamily Arctiinae. The genus was erected by Cheng-Lai Fang in 1991.

Species
Disasuridia conferta Fang, 1991 Guangdong
Disasuridia confusa Fang, 1991 Guangxi
Disasuridia fangae Kirti, Joshi & Singh, 2013 India
Disasuridia flava Fang, 1991 Xizang
Disasuridia rubida Fang, 1991 Yunnan
Disasuridia virgula Fang, 1991 Guangxi

References

Arctiinae